Loon Lake is a freshwater lake located in Waterford Township, Michigan. It borders Dixie Highway on the west and is south of Walton Blvd. on the north. The sand-bottom lake is 243 acres, making it the 18th largest lake in Oakland County, Michigan and one of the largest in Waterford Township.

Loon Lake is located on the upper reaches of the Clinton River watershed. The Clinton River enters Lake Loon on the north end from Lake Oakland upstream.

The Clinton River exits to the southwest downstream of Loon Lake.

Loon Lake also connects to Silver Lake to the east.

From Loon Lake, the Clinton River heads west toward the Drayton Plains State Fish Hatchery and then winds its way southward to Cass Lake.

At its deepest point, the lake is 73 feet deep, making it the ninth deepest lake in Oakland County.

The ten deepest lakes in Oakland County are:

1. Cass Lake (Waterford Twp. and West Bloomfield Twp.) 123 feet
2. Maceday Lake (Waterford Twp.) 117 feet
3t. Orchard Lake (West Bloomfield Twp.) 110 feet
3t. Union Lake (Commerce Twp.) 110 feet
5. Walnut Lake (West Bloomfield Twp.) 101 feet
6t. Van Norman Lake (Independence Twp. and Waterford Twp.) 90 feet
6t. Pine Lake (West Bloomfield Twp.) 90 feet
8. Lake Angelus (Auburn Hills) 88 feet
9t. Loon Lake (Waterford Twp.) 73 feet
9t. Silver Lake (Waterford Twp.) 73 feet

Loon Lake is surrounded by residential neighborhoods on all sides except the western shoreline. The community, formerly called Drayton Plains, is on the lake to the west.
In the 1960s, Loon Lake hosted annual hydroplane boat races.

Fish
Loon Lake contains a variety of fish, including black crappie, bluegill, largemouth bass, northern pike, rock bass, smallmouth bass, sunfish, walleye and yellow perch.

References

Lakes of Oakland County, Michigan
Lakes of Michigan
Lakes of Waterford Township, Michigan